Châlons Vatry Airport is a minor international airport serving Châlons-en-Champagne (formerly Châlons-sur-Marne) in northeastern France. It opened as Vatry Air Base in 1953 and switched from military to civilian use in 2000.

For freight operations, it is marketed as Vatry Europort and gave its name to the former communauté de communes de l'Europort.

History

Châlons Vatry Airport's origins began in 1950 when, with the Cold War, NATO faced several problems while attempting to solve the air power survival equation. Planning for first strike survival in both conventional and nuclear wars had to be considered. Construction began in 1953, and Vatry Air Base was designed for 50 fighters with three large hangars constructed. With the French withdrawal from the integrated NATO military structure in 1967, the American forces left Vatry Air Base and it was closed.

For many years, Vatry Air Base was under the control of the French Air Force and used for a training facility. Around 2000, it was sold to civil interests and today is being used as an international heavy cargo and commercial passenger airport.

Châlons Vatry Airport's serves too as a pilot training site for both commercial and military planes. Users of the facility include: Air France, British Airways, Brussels Airlines, KLM, Transavia, Transavia France, Swiss International Air Lines.

Due to the length of its runway, Airbus often uses this airport for testing new aircraft, such as the tests for A350 Velocity Minimum Unstick.

In March 2021, ASI-GROUP is set up on the Marne airport site in a 2,500sqm hangar to develop its customer delivery center and part of its aircraft transformation and fitting activities. This hangar will accommodate aircraft such as ATR 72, Airbus A321 or Boeing 737 or large helicopters.

Facilities
It has one paved runway designated 10/28 which measures .

Airlines and destinations
The following airlines operate regular scheduled and charter flights at Châlons Vatry Airport:

Statistics

References

External links

Official website

Airports in Grand Est
Buildings and structures in Marne (department)
Transport in Grand Est
Airports established in 1953